Danai is a town in Kachin State, in the northernmost part of Myanmar.

Kachin State (Kachin: Wunpawng Mungdan; Burmese: ကချင်ပြည်နယ်) is the northernmost state of Myanmar. It is bordered by China to the north and east (Tibet and Yunnan, specifically and respectively); Shan State to the south; and Sagaing Region and India (Arunachal Pradesh) to the west. It lies between north latitude 23° 27' and 28° 25' longitude 96° 0' and 98° 44'. The area of Kachin State is 89,041 km2 (34,379 sq mi). The capital of the state is Myitkyina. Other important towns include Bhamo, Mohnyin and Putao.

External links
 Satellite map at Maplandia.com

Township capitals of Myanmar
Populated places in Kachin State